The Sing to Me Instead Tour was the debut concert tour from American actor/singer-songwriter Ben Platt, in support of his debut solo album, Sing to Me Instead.

Background
On February 11, 2019, Platt confirmed he would embark on his debut solo concert tour in promotion for his new album. His shows included telling personal stories about his life and how he became who he is today, using his music from the album and a few covers of popular tunes to weave it all together. The tour featured opening acts Ben Abraham and Wrabel, who co-write songs on Sing to Me Instead, and ended on September 29, 2019 at Radio City Music Hall in New York City.

Tour dates

Concert film
On September 9, 2019, it was announced in advance of Platt's concert at Radio City that it would be filmed as a TV special for Netflix. Alex Timbers and Sam Wrench served as directors, and Platt, Timbers, Adam Mersel, Heather Reynolds and Fulwell 73's Ben Winston and Lee Lodge served as executive producers. This was also done to help build anticipation for the premiere of the web television series, The Politician, which Platt also starred in. The concert special, entitled Ben Platt Live from Radio City Music Hall, was completed months later and was released on Netflix on May 20, 2020.

Set list

"Bad Habit"
"Temporary Love"
"Honest Man"
"Hurt Me Once"
"New"
"The Joke" (Brandi Carlile cover)
"Better"
"Share Your Address"
"Ease My Mind"
"Rain"
"Overjoyed" (Stevie Wonder cover)
"In Case You Don't Live Forever"
"Take Me to the Pilot" (Elton John cover)
"Grow As We Go"
"Older"
"Run Away"

Musicians 

 Crystal Monee Hall - background vocals
 Kojo Littles - background vocals
 Allen René Louis - background vocals
 Mike Ricchiuti - piano, keyboards
 Nir Felder - guitars
 Justin Goldner - guitars
 Amanda Lo - violin
 Reenat Pinchas – cello
 Julia Adamy - bass
 Derrick Wright - drums
 David Cook - musical director, piano (London, Radio City)

Reception

Caroline Cronin of BroadwayWorld wrote, "Interspersing each performance with personal anecdotes, Platt appears quietly confident owning a stage as a solo artist. His joyful performances of each track were complemented by a series of very honest, heartfelt stories about his life, ranging from relationships and his coming out journey to his struggles with anxiety. Earnest without being saccharine, Platt is a naturally endearing presence, and it's clear why he's become the breakout star that he has."

References

2019 concert tours
LGBT-related music events